Junko Hoshino (born September 25, 1989) is a Japanese skier who competes in the freestyle skiing event of moguls. She represented Japan in the 2014 Winter Olympics, finishing 15th in women's moguls.

References

1989 births
Living people
Japanese female freestyle skiers
Olympic freestyle skiers of Japan
Freestyle skiers at the 2014 Winter Olympics
Freestyle skiers at the 2022 Winter Olympics
Sportspeople from Niigata Prefecture
People from Nagaoka, Niigata
21st-century Japanese women